Shan King (South) is an at-grade MTR Light Rail stop located at Shan King Shopping Centre, Shan King Estate, in Tuen Mun District, Hong Kong. It began service on 24 September 1988 and belongs to Zone 2. It serves the south of Shan King Estate.

There is only one platform in Shan King South stop for Line 505. Line 505 is routed via Shan King North and Shan King South in Siu Hong direction and is routed via Ming Kum in Sam Shing direction.

References

MTR Light Rail stops
Former Kowloon–Canton Railway stations
Tuen Mun District
Railway stations in Hong Kong opened in 1988
MTR Light Rail stops named from housing estates